Sherlock Houston Carmer (January 29, 1842December 30, 1884) was a Michigan politician. He served as a member of the Michigan House of Representatives from 1881 to 1882.

Carmer was born on January 29, 1842, in Portage County, Ohio. In 1869, he moved to Lansing, Michigan. Carmer died on December 30, 1884, of pneumonia. He was interred in Mount Hope Cemetery in Lansing.

References 

1842 births
1884 deaths
People from Portage County, Ohio
Politicians from Lansing, Michigan
Members of the Michigan House of Representatives
Michigan Independents
Deaths from pneumonia in Michigan
Burials in Michigan
19th-century American politicians